Christopher Lane may refer to:

 Christopher Lane (novelist), American author
 Christopher J. Lane, British-American medical writer, researcher, and intellectual historian
 Christopher M. Lane, member of the Massachusetts Senate
 Chris Lane, American country music singer and songwriter